The 2018 CONMEBOL South American Beach Soccer League was the second edition of the South American Beach Soccer League (named natively in Spanish as the CONMEBOL Liga Sudamericana de Fútbol Playa), a continental league competition for South American men's national beach soccer teams. 

Organised by the governing body for South American football, CONMEBOL, as part of its Development Department's Evolution Program, all ten members of the continental confederation took part, with both senior and under 20s national teams participating in the league events.

The teams were first divided into two geographically based zones (North and South) to compete in a round robin tournament against other members of their own zone during the regular season; the points earned by both the senior and under 20s teams are combined. The winners of each zone then proceeded to face each other in the finals to contest the title.

Brazil were the defending champions and successfully defended their title, defeating Paraguay in what was a repeat of the finals of the previous edition.

Format

The league operates under the same format established for the inaugural season.

Calendar

Teams

The ten member nations of CONMEBOL enter two teams each: their respective senior and under 20s national teams. In total, 20 teams will compete.

The numbers in parentheses show the South American ranking of each team prior to the start of the season (rankings only apply to the senior teams).

North zone

 (1st)
 (9th)
 (3rd)
 (7th)
 (8th)

South zone

 (4th)
 (10th)
 (5th)
 (2nd)
 (6th)

North zone

The North zone regular season event took place just outside of the Colombian city of Santa Marta. All matches were hosted in a purpose built arena on the beach of El Rodadero resort with a capacity of 1,500, in the town of Gaira, organised in cooperation with the Colombian Football Federation.

The match schedule was announced on 10 October.

The event was attended by a total of 12,500 people (avg. of 625 per match).

Matches are listed as local time in Santa Marta, COL (UTC-5).

Standings

Results

Senior category

Under 20s category

South zone
The South zone regular season event took place in the largest city of Bolivia, Santa Cruz, in cooperation with the Bolivian Football Federation. All matches took place at a purpose built stadium at Villa Olimpica Abraham Telchi.

The match schedule was announced on 26 October.

Matches are listed as local time in Santa Cruz, BOL (UTC-4).

Standings

Results

Senior category

Under 20s category

Finals

The zone winners play each other for the league title; their senior teams play each other over two legs, as do their under 20s representatives for a total of four matches comprising the finals. The winners are the nation which accumulates the most points from all four matches combined. 

The finals were organised to take place in Encarnación, Paraguay from 14–16 March 2019, in cooperation with the Paraguayan Football Association.

All matches took place at the Arena Playa de San José adjacent to San José Beach.

Matches are listed as local time in Encarnación, PYST (UTC-3).

Matches

Tiebreaker
With the series tied after all four matches were complete, a penalty shootout was contested by the senior teams to decide the winners.

Winners 
Brazil won the league to claim back-to-back titles.

References

External links
Liga Sudamericana de Futsal y Fútbol Playa – Regulations, at CONMEBOL.com (in Spanish)
South American League 2018, at Beach Soccer Russia (in Russian)

2018 in beach soccer
2019 in beach soccer
2018 in South American football
2018 in Colombian sport
2018 in Bolivian sport
2019 in Paraguayan sport
South American Beach Soccer League